Bill Carson may refer to:

Bill Carson (ice hockey) (1900–1967), Canadian Stanley Cup winning ice hockey player
Bill Carson (musician) (1926–2007), American Western swing guitarist from California
Bill Carson (sportsman) (1916–1944), New Zealand cricketer and rugby union footballer
Bill Carson (rugby league) (1932–1985), Australian rugby league footballer
"Lightning" Bill Carson, a fictional character portrayed by actor Tim McCoy in a series of films, see Straight Shooter
Bill Carson (film character), a character in The Good, the Bad and the Ugly
pseudonym of Fred Olen Ray (born 1954), American film director

See also
William Carson (disambiguation)